The 2022–23 La Liga, also known as La Liga Santander due to sponsorship reasons, is the 92nd season of La Liga, Spain's premier football competition. It commenced on 12 August 2022 and is scheduled to end on 4 June 2023.

Real Madrid are the defending champions, having won their 35th title the previous season.

With the 2022 FIFA World Cup having commenced on 20 November, there was a mid-season hiatus in the league. The last round before the break was held from 8–10 November, with the league resuming on 29 December. This season is the first since 2012–13 to conclude in June.

Teams

Promotion and relegation (pre-season)
A total of twenty teams contest the league, including seventeen sides from the 2021–22 season and three promoted from the 2021–22 Segunda División. This includes the two top teams from the Segunda División, and the winners of the promotion play-offs.

Teams relegated to Segunda División
The first team to be relegated from La Liga were Levante, after a 6–0 loss to Real Madrid on 12 May 2022, ending their five-year stay in the top tier. The second team to be relegated was Alavés, after a defeat of 1–3 by Levante on 15 May 2022, ending their six-year stay in the top tier. The third and final team relegated to Segunda was Granada, who drew against Espanyol, which was coupled with wins of Cádiz and Mallorca on 22 May 2022, the final match day. Granada ended a three-year stay in the top level.

Teams promoted from Segunda División
The first two teams to earn promotion from Segunda División were Almería and Real Valladolid, who mathematically secured first and second positions, respectively, on the very last match day of the season. Almería returned to La Liga after a seven-year absence, while Valladolid came back after one year. The third and final team to be promoted were Girona  after winning the play-off final 3–1 against Tenerife, returning after a three-year absence.

Stadiums and locations

Personnel and sponsorship

1. On the back of shirt.
2. On the sleeves.
3. On the shorts.
4. Cadiz's Shirt Sponsor was Khalifa Capital until 2 February 2023 when it was announced it would be moved to the sleeve in place of Digi Communications.

Managerial changes

League table

Results

Season statistics

Top goalscorers

Top assists

Zamora Trophy

Hat-tricks

Scoring
First goal of the season:
 Ezequiel Ávila for Osasuna against Sevilla (12 August 2022)

Discipline

Player
 Most yellow cards: 10
  Álex Baena (Villarreal)

 Most red cards: 3
  Isaac Carcelén (Cádiz)
  Luiz Felipe (Real Betis)

Team
 Most yellow cards: 89
 Mallorca
 Most red cards: 11
 Elche
 Fewest yellow cards: 45
 Athletic Club
 Fewest red cards: 1
 Girona
 Real Madrid

Awards

Monthly

Number of teams by autonomous community

References

External links

2022-23
Spain
Current association football seasons